Anthony Dullard (born 13 July 1955) is a former Australian rules footballer who played for the Melbourne Football Club in the Victorian Football League (VFL).

References

External links 		

1955 births
Australian rules footballers from Victoria (Australia)
Melbourne Football Club players
Living people